Alan Victor Harold Brooke, 3rd Viscount Alanbrooke (24 November 1932 – 10 January 2018) was a British peer.

Known to his family and friends as Victor Brooke or Victor Alanbrooke, he was the son of Field Marshal Alan Brooke, 1st Viscount Alanbrooke and his second wife Benita.

Brooke was educated at Harrow and Bristol University, earning a Bachelor of Education in 1976 and earning Qualified Teacher Status. He served in the British Army from 1952 to 1972, attaining the rank of captain in the Royal Artillery. He succeeded to the viscountcy on 19 December 1972 upon the death of his half-brother Thomas. In his recreations in Debrett's, he listed "enjoying post-Lloyd's poverty, rearranging the wreckage for remaining family."

Lord Alanbrooke lived in Hartley Wintney, Hampshire, where his father is buried. Brooke died on 10 January 2018 and his funeral took place at St Eligius Church, Arborfield. The viscounty became extinct on his death.

References

External links

1932 births
2018 deaths
Alumni of the University of Bristol
People educated at Harrow School
Royal Artillery officers
Viscounts in the Peerage of the United Kingdom

Alanbrooke